Dolichogenidea is a genus of parasitoid wasps in the family Braconidae. There are more than 360 described species in Dolichogenidea, found throughout the world.

See also
 List of Dolichogenidea species

References

Further reading

 
 
 

Microgastrinae